Josie is a diminutive of the female given name Josephine.

People
 Josie Aiello, American singer-songwriter
 Josie Arlington (1864–1914), American brothel madam
 Josie Bassett (1874–1964), American rancher associated with outlaws
 Josie Bissett (born 1970), American actress
 Josie Carroll (born 1957), Canadian Thoroughbred horse trainer
 Josie d'Arby (born 1972), Welsh television presenter
 Josie Davis (born 1973), American actress and producer
 Josie DeCarlo (1923–2012), inspiration and namesake of the fictional Josie of Josie and the Pussycats (see below)
 Josephine Earp (1861–1944), American actress and dancer called Josie by her common law husband, Western legend Wyatt Earp
 Josie Gibson (born 1985), British media personality and winner of Big Brother 2010
 Josie Ho (born 1974), Hong Kong singer and actress; daughter of Macau gambling magnate Stanley Ho
 Josie Lawrence (born 1959), British comedian and actress
 Josie Long (born 1982), British comedian
 Josie Loren (born 1987), American actress
 Josie MacAvin (1919–2005), Irish set designer
 Josie Maran (born 1978), American model and actress
 Josie Rourke (born 1976), British theatre and film director
 A ring name of professional wrestler Josette Bynum (born 1977)

Fictional characters
 Josie, lead singer and guitarist of the comic book band Josie and the Pussycats
 Josie McFarlane, in the BBC soap opera EastEnders
 Josie Moraine, from Ruta Sepetys book Out of the Easy
 Josie Packard, in the television series Twin Peaks
 Josie Pye in Anne of Green Gables
 Josie Russell (Home and Away), in the Australian soap opera Home and Away
 Josie, heroine of the 1967 Western film The Ballad of Josie, played by Doris Day
 Josie Jump, a character in the children's show Balamory.

See also
Jo
Joseph
Josephine
Josey
Jossie

English feminine given names